Rafael Murguía González (born 16 February 1986) is a former Mexican football player who last played as a striker for Deportivo Mictlán in Guatemala. He also played for Mexico in the 2003 FIFA U-17 World Championship in Finland.

References

1986 births
Living people
Atlas F.C. footballers
Dorados de Sinaloa footballers
C.D. Veracruz footballers
Association football forwards
Mexico youth international footballers
Footballers from Guadalajara, Jalisco
Mexican footballers